Julie Anne Etchingham (born 21 August 1969) is an English journalist  who works as a television newsreader with ITV News. A graduate of Newnham College, Cambridge, Etchingham joined the BBC as a trainee after completing her studies, and went on to present the children's news programme Newsround in 1994. She joined Sky News in 2002, and also presented editions of Five News when Sky won the contract to produce news programming for Channel 5 in 2005.

Etchingham is currently a newscaster on ITV News at Ten and has been since 2008. She also presented the current affairs programme Tonight from 2010 until 2022 when she announced that she would still occasionally be reporting for the show. She was voted "Presenter of the Year" at the Royal Television Society journalism awards in 2010 and 2016.

Life and career
Etchingham was born and raised in Leicester, Leicestershire, where both her parents were teachers. She was raised as a Roman Catholic, and educated at the city's English Martyrs Catholic School. After school she attended Newnham College at the University of Cambridge where she gained a BA (Honours) degree in English. She was the first girl from her school to attend Cambridge, and while reading English there was taught by Germaine Greer. She also co-presented BBC Radio Cambridgeshire's student programme On the Edge, produced by Ian Peacock. She got her first job in journalism with BBC Radio Leicester while still at school, and joined the BBC graduate programme from university.

Working at BBC Midlands, Etchingham became a presenter on Midlands Today, but soon moved on to present national programmes after moving to London. Her credits at the BBC include BBC's Breakfast News, Newsround (where she beat 1,000 other competitors to the job in 1994) and the corporation's long running Holiday programme.

Etchingham joined Sky News in 2002, where she hosted a number of shows for the channel, including Sky News Today. She was also an occasional presenter on Five News after Sky took over as news provider for Five in January 2005.

On 29 October 2007, during a speech by David Cameron, Etchingham's microphone was left open and an aside was accidentally broadcast during live coverage of the Conservative leader's address. Speaking on the issue of immigration, Cameron said: "Let me outline the action that a Conservative government would take. As we have seen, some of the increase in population size results from natural change – birth rates, death rates. Here our policy should be obvious ..." At this point, Etchingham was clearly heard to say: "Extermination". 
Sky News said afterwards that her comment was "regrettable". Etchingham later described the incident as "not my finest hour. I apologised to Cameron personally". Cameron took the incident in good jest, recorded a parody of the incident for Etchingham's 40th birthday and had a toy Dalek delivered to her home.

On 31 October 2007, ITV confirmed that in January 2008 Etchingham would move to present the relaunched News at Ten with Sir Trevor McDonald. The programme returned on 14 January. In June 2009, it was reported in the media that the President of Pakistan, Asif Ali Zardari, had stopped a plane from flying out of Pakistan after he heard Etchingham was running late after an interview between the two. In October 2009, it was announced that Etchingham would present a relaunched Tonight programme from early 2010 – with the show airing once a week on Thursday nights.

In April 2011, Etchingham and Phillip Schofield co-hosted ITV's coverage of the wedding of Prince William and Kate Middleton. It was announced in April 2012 that she and Schofield would present the broadcaster's coverage of the Queen's Diamond Jubilee in June. In March 2013, she travelled to Rome to provide coverage of the election of Pope Francis for ITV News.

In March 2015 it was announced that Etchingham would chair a televised leaders debate for ITV ahead of the 2015 general election, the only leaders debate featuring Prime Minister David Cameron to be held that year. The programme was called The ITV Leaders' Debate. The debate took place on 2 April. Andrew Pettie of The Telegraph described Etchingham's presenting style as "composure itself", adding that it was "a bit robotic but this was no bad thing: it was refreshing to see a TV interviewer resolutely refusing to hog the limelight." She later co-presented the ITV coverage of the general election with Tom Bradby.

In October 2015, News at Ten relaunched and returned to the single newscaster format, with former political editor Tom Bradby becoming the programme's new main presenter. Etchingham continues on the programme as Deputy Anchor, sharing the role with Rageh Omaar. Etchingham also files special reports for the programme.

In June 2016, she chaired Cameron and Farage Live: The EU Referendum and The ITV Referendum Debate for ITV News.

In May 2017, Etchingham returned to chair The ITV Leaders' Debate ahead of the 2017 General Election.

On 5 June 2017, Etchingham conducted an interview with Prime Minister Theresa May, in which she talked about running through fields of wheat, which became a meme.

On 3 July 2017, Etchingham presented a special edition of News at Ten celebrating 50 years of the programme. She interviewed Sir Trevor McDonald, a former presenter of the programme.

On 19 May 2018, Etchingham co-presented ITV's coverage of the wedding of Prince Harry and Meghan Markle with Phillip Schofield.

On 9 July 2019, Etchingham presented Britain’s Next Prime Minister: The ITV Debate. The programme was broadcast live from Dock 10, MediaCityUK.

On 17 April 2021, Etchingham co-presented ITV's coverage of the funeral of Prince Philip, Duke of Edinburgh with Tom Bradby.

Awards
Etchingham was voted "Presenter of the Year" at the Royal Television Society journalism awards in February 2010. She was the first woman to win the award. She won it again in February 2016. In April 2016, Etchingham was named "Broadcast Journalist of the Year" by the London Press Club.

Personal life 
In 1997, Etchingham married the television producer Nick Gardner. The couple have two sons, both of whom were born in Hammersmith and Fulham, London.

Charity
Etchingham is vice president of the stillbirth charity Abigail's Footsteps. She is also a patron of the London homeless charity, Caritas Anchor House. Since 2018, Etchingham has also taken on the role of president at the Women of the Year Lunch and awards.

Filmography

See also 

 List of ITV journalists and newsreaders

References

External links

|-

|-

|-

1969 births
Alumni of Newnham College, Cambridge
BBC newsreaders and journalists
BBC radio presenters
BBC television presenters
English journalists
English reporters and correspondents
English Roman Catholics
English television presenters
ITN newsreaders and journalists
Living people
Newsround presenters
People from Leicester
Sky News newsreaders and journalists
Television personalities from Leicestershire